Douglas Scott Wreden (born January 18, 1991), also known as DougDoug or Gloudas, is an American YouTuber, Twitch streamer, and former Hearthstone caster and producer. He makes gaming videos that revolve around him doing various gaming challenges.

Career

Esports
Wreden worked for Electronic Arts as a programmer, before leaving to work on the Hearthstone Championship Tour for ESL  under the online alias Gloudas. He then worked for esports organization Tempo Storm and was also a producer for the Hearthstone Trinity Series. In March 2018, he entered Hearthstone "So you think you can cast?" competition.

Streaming
Wreden transitioned to being a Twitch streamer and YouTuber under the name DougDoug. He gained media attention in October 2020 after streaming Grand Theft Auto 5 on Twitch, where he allowed his viewers to input commands in the Twitch chat that affected the game. In January 2022, he garnered more media attention after streaming and completing a Super Mario Odyssey "HUD Challenge" speedrun, wherein compounding heads-up displays (HUDs) appeared on his screen after every five minutes. Although he completed the challenge, he was unable to complete it in under one hour, 11 minutes, and 21 seconds, his personal non-"HUD Challenge" best.

In August 2021, Wreden hosted an eight-hour birthday fundraiser for Rosa, a sea otter at the Monterey Bay Aquarium. His 2022 birthday stream for Rosa raised over $104,000.

Personal life 
Wreden was born on January 18, 1991. He graduated from the University of California, Berkeley with a degree in computer science. As of July 2022, he resides in the state of Washington. Wreden is the brother of Davey Wreden, the designer of The Stanley Parable and director of The Beginner's Guide.

Awards and nominations

References

External links 

Twitch (service) streamers
Living people
1991 births
Esports commentators
American YouTubers
University of California, Berkeley alumni